Grégoire Polet (15 April 1978, Uccle) is a Belgian writer and poet.

Biography  
Also a translator, Grégoire is a Doctor of Arts of the Université catholique de Louvain, specializing in Spanish literature. He is now a full-time writer and lives in Barcelona. For his inspiration he often found himself in the cities that concerned his history: when he wrote Madrid ne dort pas, his first book, he rented an apartment in Madrid. The same goes for Chucho whose action takes place in Barcelona.

At Lycée Martin V in Louvain-la-Neuve (Belgium), he was fellow with writer . Their novels manifestly maintain close relations: often choral novels, written in the present of the indicative, very numerous and recurring characters from one book to another, always staged in urban areas (Paris, Rome, Brussels, Madrid, Prague, Barcelona, etc.), with a predilection for the representation of the simultaneity of destinies in an urban context.

Works

Novels 
2005: Madrid ne dort pas, Éditions Gallimard,  2005.
2006: Excusez les fautes du copiste, Gallimard,  2006. Prix spécial Écrivain de la Fondation Jean-Luc Lagardère.
Les Impressions nouvelles). Prix Fénéon 2007. Prix Grand-Chosier 2007. Novel niminated in the first selection of prix Goncourt 2007.
2009: Chucho, Gallimard, prix Sander Pierron of the Académie royale de langue et de littérature françaises de Belgique.
2010: Petit éloge de la gourmandise, collection folio
2012: Les Ballons d'hélium, Gallimard

Translations 
2007: Juan Valera, Pepita Jiménez (Translation and foreword by Grégoire Polet), Geneva, Editions Zoé

References

External links 
 Sonnets de Grégoire Polet sur le site Bon à tirer
 Grégoire Polet on Babelio
 Avec Grégoire Polet, Barcelone ne dort jamais on Le Figaro (19 February 2015)
 Grégoire Polet on France Inter
 Barcelona ! Grégoire Polet on La Cause littéraire (23 February 2015)

Belgian writers in French
21st-century Belgian writers
Université catholique de Louvain alumni
Prix Fénéon winners
1978 births
People from Uccle
Living people